Dirk Baert (born 14 February 1949) is a Belgian retired road and track cyclist. On track, he won one gold and two bronze medals in the individual pursuit at the world championships in 1971, 1972 and 1975. He competed at the 1968 Summer Olympics in the 1 km time trial and finished in 18th place. On the road, he won the Omloop van de Vlaamse Scheldeboorden (1975), Le Samyn (1976), Halle–Ingooigem (1978) and Grote 1-MeiPrijs (1979), as well as one stage of the Tour of Belgium (1974). He rode the Tour de France in 1974.

References

1949 births
Living people
Olympic cyclists of Belgium
Cyclists at the 1968 Summer Olympics
Belgian male cyclists
People from Zwevegem
UCI Track Cycling World Champions (men)
Cyclists from West Flanders
Belgian track cyclists